Plasmodium josephinae is a parasite of the genus Plasmodium subgenus Sauramoeba. It was described in 1967 by Peláez. As in all Plasmodium species, P. josephinae has both vertebrate and insect hosts. The vertebrate hosts for this parasite are reptiles.

Taxonomy
This species was described by Peláez in 1967.

Distribution 
This species occurs in Mexico.

References 

josephinae